= Richmond International Midget hockey tournament =

The Richmond International Midget Hockey Tournament is one of the largest tournaments held in North America. This tournament is an ice hockey tournament held annually for midget aged players in Richmond, British Columbia, Canada.

The Tournament is held at the two Richmond arenas under the auspices of Richmond Minor Hockey Association and is sanctioned by Hockey Canada. The tournament gets underway every year starting on Boxing Day, and concludes on New Year's Eve, with the Elite Division and AAA Division Championship games being played at Minoru Arena.

The tournament features 60 teams and approximately 170 games with more than eleven hundred participants, aged 15–18, from across Canada, the United States and Europe. Each team is guaranteed to play at least five (5) games with 3-20 minute stop-time periods.

All proceeds from this Tournament go directly to the Richmond Minor Midget Hockey Scholarship Program. We do not charge an entrance fee, so we ask that spectators support our 50/50 draws, raffle and program sales.

In 2008, the AAA Gold final game proved to be one of the highlights of the tournament, seeing the two local teams from Richmond BC, Richmond Minor Hockey Associations and Seafair Minor Hockey Association, playing off against each other for the title. The AAA Gold game was played before a sold out crowd of more than 1600 fans that left standing room only at the Minoru Arena. The Seafair Islanders won the Championship 5-2.

In 2008, the British Columbia Junior Hockey League joined as a sponsor of the tournament. The BCHL schedules a regular league game to be played during our tournament. The inaugural game featured the Surrey Eagles and the Powell River Kings. This Junior A game was a big hit with the players of our tournament, as the two teams played to a crowd of more than 1300 fans. The game was played in true Junior A fashion, with end-to-end action, overtime and all.

== Tournament History ==
The tournament began in 1980 as a B tournament with 10 teams participating.

In 1992, after the completion of the Richmond Ice Centre, the tournament expanded the B division to an AA/B division with 20 participating teams and added the AAA division with 20 participating teams.

In 2004, the Elite AAA division was added, and the tournament size grew again, with a total of 60 teams participating in all three divisions.

== Tournament Format ==
- "Elite AAA" Division consists of 12 teams, 2 pools of 6 teams.

The format sees the top 4 teams from Each Pool proceed to a playoff format. (1 vs 4 and 2 vs 3 from the opposite pool).
The 5th and 6th place teams in their pools will play a Consolation game with a team from the other pool.

- "AAA" Division consists of 28 teams, 4 pools of 7 teams.
- "AA/B" Division consists of 20 teams, 4 pools of 5 teams. The format is set up as a flight series, allowing more teams to advance into the playoffs.

Gold Flight - the 1st and 2nd place teams in each pool will advance to a Quarter-final in the Gold Flight. The winning teams from the Quarter-finals advance to a Semi-Final, and the winning teams from the Semi-final advance into the Gold Final.

Silver Flight - the 3rd and 4th place teams in each pool will advance to a quarter-final in the Silver Flight. The winning teams from the Quarter-finals advance to a Semi-Final, and the winning teams from the Semi-Final advance to the Silver Final.

Bronze Flight - the 5th and 6th place teams in each pool will advance to a quarter final in the Bronze Flight. The winning teams from the Quarter-finals advance to a Semi-Final, and the winning teams from the Semi-Final advance to the Bronze Final.

== Past champions ==
=== Elite AAA Division ===
This division was added in 2004.

- 2009: Moose Jaw AAA Warriors
- 2008: San Jose Jr Sharks U18
- 2007: South Island Thunderbirds
- 2006: Vancouver Greater Canadians
- 2005: Chicago Chill
- 2004: Anchorage North Stars

=== Midget AAA ===
This division was added in 1992.

- 2009: Seafair Islanders
- 2008: Seafair Islanders
- 2007: Vancouver Thunderbirds
- 2006: Prince George
- 2005: California North Stars
- 2004: Ridge Meadows
- 2003: North Vancouver
- 2002: Kelowna
- 2001: Coquitlam
- 2000: Kelowna
- 1999: Regina Canadians
- 1998: Tisdale Saskatchewan
- 1997: Edmonton MLAC
- 1996: Prince Albert
- 1995: Chilliwack
- 1994: Chilliwack
- 1993: Victoria
- 1992: Richmond

=== Midget AA/B ===
- 2009: Campbell River Tyees
- 2008: Boise Jr. Steelheads U18
- 2007: Kerry Park
- 2006: Kelowna
- 2005: Kerry Park
- 2004: Fairbanks Arctic Lions
- 2003: Alaska blue devils
- 2002: Arctic Lions
- 2001: Alaska All Stars
- 2000: Alaska all Stars
- 1999: Seattle Snokings
- 1998: Victoria
- 1997: Alaska Bulldogs
- 1996: Victoria Racq. Club
- 1995: Richmond B1
- 1994: Alaska All Stars
- 1993: Richmond B1
- 1992: Langley
- 1991: Chilliwack
- 1990: Victoria Racq. Club
- 1989: No Tournament
- 1988: Burnaby Minor
- 1987: Kamloops
- 1986: North Vancouver
- 1985: Burnaby Minor
- 1984: N. Shore Winter Club
- 1983: Abbotsford
- 1982: N. Shore Winter Club
- 1981: 100 Mile House
- 1980: N. Shore Winter Club
